Les Bonbons may refer to:

Les Bonbons (album) by Jacques Brel
The title track from the above album.

See also
Bon Bon (disambiguation)